Thierry Rassat is a French ski mountaineer. As a member of the national team, he finished tenth in the team event of the 2001 European Championship, together with René Gachet.

References 

Living people
French male ski mountaineers
Year of birth missing (living people)
20th-century French people
21st-century French people